Douglas Township is a township in Mitchell County, Iowa, USA.

History
Douglas Township was first settled in 1855.

References

Townships in Mitchell County, Iowa
Townships in Iowa